Trinny & Susannah: Stylar om Sverige (Trinny & Susannah: Making over Sweden) is a Swedish/British television show, first aired on Swedish channel TV4 Plus on 28 March 2011. In each episode, Trinny and Susannah visit a Swedish city where they go out and find people that they think need some help with their style. Ten persons get chosen for each show and each gets a total makeover and the opportunity to walk the runway in front of their family and friends.

Trinny and Susannah have visited Karlstad, Lund, Stockholm, Borås, Vällingby, Göteborg and Borlänge.

References

Fashion-themed reality television series
Makeover reality television series
TV4 (Sweden) original programming
2011 British television series debuts
2011 Swedish television series debuts
2011 in fashion
Swedish fashion